The women's 20 kilometres walk event at the 2007 All-Africa Games was held on July 19.

Results

References
Results

Walk